Louis De Grève (17 October 1929 – 12 May 2021) was a Belgian politician.

Biography
De Grève held a doctorate of law before becoming a politician. In 1958, he was elected to the Municipal Council of Halle, holding this position until 1984. He served as Schepen of the city from 1976 to 1982 and was Mayor from 1965 to 1971. He was also a Provincial Council member for Brabant from 1977 to 1984.

A member of the Party for Freedom and Progress, De Grève served in the Senate from 1974 to 1977 for the Arrondissement of Brussels and represented the same district in the Chamber of Representatives from 1977 to 1984. He then sat on the Flemish Council from 21 October 1980 to September 1984, chairing his party's faction for the majority of his term.

De Grève was appointed a judge to the Constitutional Court, where he remained until 16 October 1999. On 14 September 1993, he succeeded  as chairman of the Dutch-speaking group on the Court. He himself was succeeded in this position by Georges De Baets.

Louis De Grève died on 12 May 2021 at the age of 91.

References

1929 births
2021 deaths
Mayors of places in Belgium
Members of the Flemish Parliament
Members of the Senate (Belgium)
Members of the Chamber of Representatives (Belgium)
Party for Freedom and Progress politicians
People from Halle, Belgium